Sarab-e Cheggeh (also Romanized as Sarāb-e Cheggeh and Sarāb-e Chekkeh; also known as Chagha, and Sarab Chakeh, and Sarāb-e Chekkeh-ye ‘Olyā) is a village in Dowreh Rural District, Chegeni District, Dowreh County, Lorestan Province, Iran. At the 2006 census, its population was 779, in 168 families.

References 

Towns and villages in Dowreh County